Randy Johnston may refer to:

 Randy Johnston (musician) (born 1956), American jazz guitarist
 Randy Johnston (model) (1988–2008), American model
 Randy Johnston (ice hockey) (born 1958), Canadian ice hockey player

See also
 Randy Johnson (disambiguation)